Fred Kinuthia (born 10 May 1969) is a Kenyan boxer. He competed in the men's light welterweight event at the 2000 Summer Olympics.

References

External links
 

1969 births
Living people
Kenyan male boxers
Olympic boxers of Kenya
Boxers at the 2000 Summer Olympics
Place of birth missing (living people)
Light-welterweight boxers